Ihorombe is a region in Madagascar. It borders Haute Matsiatra region in north, Atsimo-Atsinanana in east, Anosy in south and Atsimo-Andrefana in west. The capital is Ihosy and the population was 418,520 in 2018.

Sports
FC Ihosy (football)

Administrative divisions
Ihorombe Region is divided into three districts, which are sub-divided into 31 communes.

 Iakora District - 5 communes
 Ihosy District - 20 communes
 Ivohibe District - 6 communes

Transport

Airport
Ihosy Airport

Protected Areas
Part of Fandriana-Vondrozo Corridor
 Isalo National Park
 Part of Kalambatritra Reserve
 Pic d'Ivohibe Reserve

References

 
Regions of Madagascar